Kiichi Arita (30 April 1901 – 9 February 1986) was a Japanese politician. During his time in politics, he served as the Minister of State for Economic and Fiscal Policy, Director of the Defense Agency, Foreign Minister, and Minister of Education.

Career
As Chairman of the Research Commission on National Security, Arita participated in the debate over the Treaty on the Non-Proliferation of Nuclear Weapons. The three pillars supporting the treaty were "non-proliferation, disarmament, and the right to peacefully use nuclear technology." Arita and his clique agreed with the first two, but did not like the third. However, Arita was willing to accept the treaty's pillars.

As foreign minister under Prime Minister Eisaku Satō, Arita pursued a proactive foreign policy. He believed that Japan needed to make "positive contributions to the 'fight for peace'". He wanted Japan to do everything possible to reduce international tension. However, in the case of a military threat, Arita stressed the importance of US-Japan cooperation and the strength of the Japan Self-Defense Force.

Arita was one of the two supporters of Takeo Fukuda who were chosen to have a ministerial position under Prime Minister Kakuei Tanaka. Fukuda and his supporters were angered by the appointment of Tanaka as the successor of Satō, as Fukuda had previously been one of the top candidates for succeeding him. Upon his calling to the cabinet, then, Arita declined service in his position, citing the lack of representation for Fukuda supporters within the government. However, Tanaka convinced Fukuda to let his two supporters serve in their roles.

Arita was skeptical of the Chinese nuclear program, perceiving it as a direct "threat" and stating so in 1969. He thus called on Japan to increase its preparedness for a "worst-case scenario". This was before the change in the Defense Agency's perception of China to an indirect threat in early 1970 under Prime Minister Yasuhiro Nakasone. Arita was also the writer of the first Defense white paper in Japan in 1970 - his original draft argued for increased defense capability if there was ever a "delay" in assistance from the US in case of an invasion, but the final draft saw Arita back down on this, as he called for "autonomous defence capability" only, a controversial move.

References

Citations

Bibliography
 
 
 
 
 

1901 births
1986 deaths
Liberal Democratic Party (Japan) politicians
Foreign ministers of Japan
Education ministers of Japan